Takako Ebata is a Japanese politician. She was a Member of the House of Representatives for Tokyo's 10th district from 2009 to 2012.

Background 
She has an education degree from Yokohama National University and a Master of Science in Management from the Sloan School of Management at the Massachusetts Institute of Technology.

Takoko was an associate professor at the University of Tokyo before winning a ticket to the House of Representatives in the 2009 Japanese general election.

References 

Living people
Japanese women academics
21st-century Japanese politicians
21st-century Japanese women politicians
Members of the House of Representatives (Japan)
Yokohama National University alumni
MIT Sloan School of Management alumni
Academic staff of the University of Tokyo
Year of birth missing (living people)